The Macagua Dam, officially known as Antonio José de Sucre, is an embankment dam with concrete gravity sections on the Caroní River in Ciudad Guayana, Bolívar State, Venezuela. The dam's main purpose is hydroelectric power generation and it was later named after Antonio José de Sucre.

Dam

Power plants

Macagua I
The first generator was complete in 2010, the second is expected to be completed in 2011 and another each year thereafter.

Macagua II
Macagua II began operation in 1996 and was inaugurated in January 1997.

Macagua III
Macagua II began operation in 1996 and was inaugurated in January 1997.

External links

References

Dams completed in 1961
Dams in Venezuela
Embankment dams
Buildings and structures in Bolívar (state)
Buildings and structures in Ciudad Guayana